Reader's Digest is an American general-interest family magazine, published ten times a year. Formerly based in Chappaqua, New York, it is now headquartered in midtown Manhattan. The magazine was founded in 1922 by DeWitt Wallace and his wife Lila Bell Wallace. For many years, Reader's Digest was the best-selling consumer magazine in the United States; it lost the distinction in 2009 to Better Homes and Gardens. According to Mediamark Research (2006), Reader's Digest reached more readers with household incomes of over $100,000 than Fortune, The Wall Street Journal, Business Week, and Inc. combined.

Global editions of Reader's Digest reach an additional 40 million people in more than 70 countries, via 49 editions in 21 languages. The periodical has a global circulation of 10.5 million, making it the largest paid-circulation magazine in the world.

It is also published in Braille, digital, audio, and a large type called "Reader's Digest Large Print." The magazine is compact, with its pages roughly half the size of most American magazines. Hence, in the summer of 2005, the U.S. edition adopted the slogan "America in your pocket." In January 2008, it was changed to "Life well shared."

History

Inception and growth
In 1922, DeWitt Wallace started the magazine while he was recovering from shrapnel wounds received in World War I. Wallace had the idea to gather a sampling of favorite articles on many subjects from various monthly magazines, sometimes condensing and rewriting them, and to combine them into one magazine.

Since its inception Reader's Digest has maintained a conservative and anti-Communist perspective on political and social issues. The Wallaces initially hoped the journal could provide $5,000 of net income. Wallace's assessment of what the potential mass-market audience wanted to read led to rapid growth. By 1929, the magazine had 290,000 subscribers and had a gross income of $900,000 a year. The first international edition was published in the United Kingdom in 1938. By the 40th anniversary of Reader's Digest, it had 40 international editions, in 13 languages and Braille, and at one point, it was the largest-circulating journal in China, Mexico, Spain, Sweden, Peru, and other countries, with a total international circulation of 23 million.

The magazine's format for several decades consisted of 30 articles per issue (one per day), along with an "Increase your Word Power" vocabulary quiz, a page of "Amusing Anecdotes" and "Personal Glimpses", two features of funny stories entitled "Humor in Uniform" and "Life in these United States", and a lengthier article at the end, usually condensed from a published book. Other regular features were "My Most Unforgettable Character" (since discontinued), the "Drama in Real Life" survival stories. and more recently "That's Outrageous". These were all listed in the table of contents on the front cover. Each article was prefaced by a small, simple line drawing. In more recent times, the format evolved into flashy, colorful, eye-catching graphics throughout, and many short bits of data interspersed with full articles. The table of contents is now contained inside. From 2003 to 2007, the back cover featured "Our America", paintings of Rockwell-style whimsical situations by artist C. F. Payne. Another monthly consumer advice feature is "What [people in various professions] won't tell you," with a different profession featured each time.

The first "Word Power" column of the magazine was published in the January 1945 edition, written by Wilfred J. Funk. In December 1952, the magazine published "Cancer by the Carton", a series of articles that linked smoking with lung cancer and this topic was later repeated in other articles.

From 2002 through 2006, Reader's Digest conducted a vocabulary competition in schools throughout the US called Reader's Digest National Word Power Challenge. In 2007, the magazine said it will not have the competition for the 2007–08 school year: "...but rather to use the time to evaluate the program in every respect, including scope, mission, and model for implementation."

In 2006, the magazine published three more local-language editions in Slovenia, Croatia, and Romania. In October 2007, the Digest expanded into Serbia. The magazine's licensee in Italy stopped publishing in December 2007. The magazine launched in the People's Republic of China in 2008.

For 2010, the US edition of the magazine reduced its publishing schedule to 10 times a year rather than 12, and to increase digital offerings. It also cut its circulation guarantee for advertisers to 5.5 million copies from 8 million. In announcing that decision, in June 2009, the company said that it planned to reduce its number of celebrity profiles and how-to features, and increase the number of inspiring spiritual stories and stories about the military.

Beginning in January 2013, the US edition was increased to 12 times a year.

Business organization and ownership

In 1990, the magazine's parent company, The Reader's Digest Association, Inc. (RDA), became a publicly traded corporation. From 2005 through 2010, RDA reported a net loss each year.

In March 2007, Ripplewood Holdings LLC led a consortium of private-equity investors who bought the company through a leveraged buyout for US$2.8 billion, financed primarily by the issuance of US$2.2 billion of debt. Ripplewood invested $275 million of its own money, and had partners including Rothschild Bank of Zürich and GoldenTree Asset Management of New York. The private-equity deal tripled the association's interest payments, to $148 million a year.

On August 24, 2009, RDA announced it had filed with the US Bankruptcy court an arranged Chapter 11 bankruptcy to continue operations, and to restructure the US$2.2 billion debt undertaken by the leveraged buyout transaction. The company emerged from bankruptcy with the lenders exchanging debt for equity, and Ripplewood's entire equity investment was extinguished.

In April 2010, the UK arm was sold to its management. It has a licensing deal with the US company to continue publishing the UK edition.

On February 17, 2013, RDA Holding filed for bankruptcy a second time. The company was purchased for £1 by Mike Luckwell, a venture capitalist and once the biggest shareholder in WPP plc.

Direct marketing
RDA offers many mail-order products included with "sweepstakes" or contests. US Reader's Digest and the company's other US magazines do not use sweepstakes in their direct-mail promotions. A notable shift to electronic direct marketing has been undertaken by the company to adapt to shifting media landscape.  In the mid-20th century, phonograph record albums of popular classical and easy-listening music, bearing the magazine's name, were sold by mail. Reader's Digest also partnered with RCA to offer a mail-order music club which offered discount pricing on vinyl records.

Sweepstakes agreement
In 2001, 32 states' attorneys general reached agreements with the company and other sweepstakes operators to settle allegations that they tricked the elderly into buying products because they were a "guaranteed winner" of a lottery. The settlement required the companies to expand the type size of notices in the packaging that no purchase is necessary to play the sweepstakes, and to:
 Establish a "Do Not Contact List" and refrain from soliciting any future "high-activity" customers unless and until Reader's Digest actually makes contact with that customer and determines that the customer is not buying because they believe that the purchase will improve their chances of winning.
 Send letters to individuals who spend more than $1,000 in a six-month period telling them that they are not required to make purchases to win the sweepstakes, that making a purchase will not improve their chances of winning, and that all entries have the same chance to win whether or not the entry is accompanied by a purchase.

The agreement appeared to adversely affect Reader's Digest circulation in the U.S. Its 1970s peak circulation was 17 million U.S. subscribers.

The UK edition of Reader's Digest has also been criticized by the Trading Standards Institute for preying on the elderly and vulnerable with misleading bulk mailings that claim the recipient is guaranteed a large cash prize and advising them not to discuss this with anyone else. Following their complaint, the Advertising Standards Authority said they would be launching an investigation. The ASA investigation upheld the complaint in 2008, ruling that the Reader's Digest mailing was irresponsible and misleading (particularly for the elderly) and had breached three clauses of the Committee of Advertising Practice code. Reader's Digest was told not to use this mailing again.

International editions
International editions have made Reader's Digest the best-selling monthly journal in the world. Its worldwide circulation including all editions has reached 17 million copies and 70 million readers. Reader's Digest is currently published in 49 editions and 21 languages and is available in over 70 countries, including Slovenia, Croatia, and Romania in 2008.

Its international editions account for about 50% of the magazine's trade volume. In each market, local editors commission or purchase articles for their own markets and share content with U.S. and other editions. The selected articles are then translated by local translators and the translations edited by the local editors to make them match the "well-educated informal" style of the American edition.

Over the 90 years, the company has published editions in various languages in different countries, or for different regions. Often, these editions started out as translations of the U.S. version of the magazine, but over time they became unique editions, providing material more germane to local readers. Local editions that still publish the bulk of the American Reader's Digest are usually titled with a qualifier, such as the Portuguese edition,  (Selections from Reader's Digest), or the Swedish edition,  (The Best of Reader's Digest).

The list is sorted by year of first publication. Some countries had editions but no longer do; for example, the Danish version of Reader's Digest ceased publication in 2005 and was replaced by the Swedish version; as a result, the Swedish edition covers stories about both countries (but written solely in Swedish).

 1938 – United Kingdom (sold in 2010, operated under license)
 1940 – Cuba and Latin America (in Spanish) (as )
 1942 – Brazil
 1943 – Sweden, Egypt (in Arabic)
 1945 – Finland
 1946 – Australia, Denmark, Japan
 1947 – Belgium (in French), France, Norway, Canadian French
 1948 – Canada (English), Japan (operations discontinued in 1985), Germany, South Africa, Switzerland (in French and German), Italy (operations discontinued in 2007)
 1950 – Argentina, New Zealand
 1954 – India and Pakistan (in English)
 1957 – Netherlands
 1959 – Chile, Costa Rica and Central America
 1965 – Taiwan, Hong Kong and Southeast Asia (in traditional Chinese)
 1968 – Belgium (Dutch)
 1971 – Puerto Rico and United States (in Spanish), Portugal
 1978 – South Korea (operations discontinued in 2009)
 1991 – Hungary, Russia
 1993 – Czech Republic
 1995 – Poland
 1996 – Thailand (operations discontinued in 2014)
 1997 – Slovakia
 2004 – Indonesia (operations discontinued in October 2015)
 2005 – Romania, Slovenia, Croatia, Bulgaria
 2007 – Bosnia and Herzegovina, Serbia, Ukraine
 2008 – China (operations discontinued in 2012)

Arabic editions
The first Reader's Digest publication in the Arab World was printed in Egypt in September 1943. The license was eventually terminated.

The second effort and the first Reader's Digest franchise agreement was negotiated through the efforts of Frederick Pittera, in 1976, an American entrepreneur, who sold the idea to Lebanon's former foreign minister, Lucien Dahdah, then son-in-law of Suleiman Frangieh, President of Lebanon. Dahdah partnered with Ghassan Tueni (former Lebanon ambassador to the United Nations, and publisher of  newspaper, Beirut) in publishing Reader's Digest in the Arabic language. It was printed in Cairo for distribution throughout the Arab world under title . In format,  was the same as the U.S. edition with 75% of the editorial content. Philip Hitti, Chairman of Princeton University's Department of Oriental Languages and a team of Arabic advisers counseled on what would be of interest to Arabic readers.

Canadian edition
The Canadian edition first appeared in July 1947 in French and in February 1948 in English, and today the vast majority of it is Canadian content. Nearly all major and minor articles are locally produced or selected from Canadian publications that match the Digest style. Usually, there is one American article in each issue.

"Life's Like That" is the Canadian name of "Life in These United States." Most of the other rubrics are taken from the American publication.

The current editor-in-chief is Mark Pupo.

Indian edition
The Indian edition was first published in 1954. Its circulation then was 40,000 copies. It was published for many years by the Tata Group of companies. Today, the magazine is published in India by Living Media India Ltd, and sold over 600,000 copies monthly in 2008 under the then editor Mohan Sivanand, who retired in 2015. It prints Indian and international articles. According to the Indian Readership Survey Round II of 2009, the readership for Reader's Digest was 3.94 million, second only to India Today at 5.62 million. That has since declined. In the 2017 Survey, the India edition had fallen to ninth position with a readership of 1.354 million, and in the latest Survey (Quarter 1 of 2019), it is not seen in the Top 10 list of English-language magazines published in India.
The incumbent India editor is Sanghamitra Chakraborty.

Australian edition
Reader's Digest Australia has an any issue readership of 1.5 million (according to Nielsen) and a circulation of over 200,000. The magazine has a guaranteed audience with a 90% subscription rate. The group editor is Louise Waterson.

Books
Reader's Digest publishes bi-monthly a series of softcover anthologies called Reader's Digest Select Editions (previously known as Reader's Digest Condensed Books). During the 1970s, there was also a Reader's Digest Press, which published full-length, original works of non-fiction.

In Germany, Reader's Digest runs an own book-publishing house called  which not only publishes the German edition of the Reader's Digest magazine. Since 1955, it has published  (a German edition of Reader's Digest Condensed Books). Besides publishing the magazine, the publisher is especially well known in Germany for the science fiction anthology  ("The Road to Tomorrow"), consisting of 50 hardcover volumes of classic science fiction novels (such as Robert A. Heinlein's Stranger in a Strange Land, Arthur C. Clarke's 2001, or Ray Bradbury's Fahrenheit 451, usually two novels per volume) published between 1986 and 1995.

As well, Reader's Digest re-printed classic literature in long-wearing colored board cover hardcovers. Rebecca by Daphne Du Maurier, Roughing It by Mark Twain, and My Antonia by Willa Cather were among this run of books.

Editors-in-chief
 Lila Bell Wallace and DeWitt Wallace (1922–1964)
 Hobart D. Lewis (1964–1976)
 Edward T. Thompson (1976–1984)
 Kenneth O. Gilmore (1984–1990)
 Kenneth Tomlinson (1990–1996)
 Christopher Willcox (1996–2000)
 Eric Schrier (2000–2001)
 Jacqueline Leo (2001–2007)
 Peggy Northrop (2007–2011)
 Liz Vaccariello (2011–2016)
 Bruce Kelley (2016–2021)
 Jason Buhrmester (2021–present)

See also
 World's Best Reading
 List of United States magazines
 John Patric, noted writer for Reader's Digest during the 1930s and 1940s
 "My Last Wonderful Days", a 1956 article about an Iowa woman dying from cancer

References

Bibliography

 John Bainbridge, Little Wonder. Or, the Reader's Digest and How It Grew, New York: Reynal & Hitchcock, 1945.
 John Heidenry, Theirs Was the Kingdom: Lila and DeWitt Wallace and the Story of the Reader's Digest, New York/London: W.W. Norton, 1993
 Samuel A. Schreiner, The Condensed World of the Reader's Digest, New York: Stein and Day, 1977.
 James Playsted Wood, Of Lasting Interest: The Story of the Reader's Digest, Westport, Connecticut: Greenwood Press, 1958.
 Clem Robyns, "The Internationalisation of Social and Cultural Values: On the Homogenization and Localization Strategies of the Reader's Digest", Folia Translatologica 3, 1994, 83–92
 Joanne P. Sharp, Condensing the Cold War: Reader's Digest and American Identity, University of Minnesota Press, 2000.
 Joanne P. Sharp, Hegemony, popular culture and geopolitics: the Reader's Digest and the construction of danger, Political Geography, Elsevier, 1996.
 Visnja Milidragovic, "From direct marketing tool to digital niche product: a Reader's Digest Sweepstakes case study", SFU, 2012.

External links

 

 
Lifestyle magazines published in the United States
Monthly magazines published in the United States
Conservative magazines published in the United States
Digests
English-language magazines
General interest digests
Magazines established in 1922
Magazines published in New York (state)
Magazines published in New York City
Private equity portfolio companies
Companies that filed for Chapter 11 bankruptcy in 2009
Companies that filed for Chapter 11 bankruptcy in 2013